Chevry Lomday Mishnayes Synagogue is a historic former synagogue building at 148-150 Bedford Street in Hartford, Connecticut.  Built in 1924, it is unusual for an ecclesiastical structure in that its design appears to be based on that of an apartment house.  It housed an Orthodox Jewish congregation until 1963, and now houses the local House of God Church.  It was listed on the National Register of Historic Places in 1995 for its architecture.

Description and history
The former Chevry Lomday Mishnayes Synagogue stands in Hartford's Clay-Arsenal neighborhood north of the downtown, at the southeast corner of Mather and Bedford Streets.  It is a masonry structure, built out of red brick with trim of orange and yellow brick.  It is three stories in height, with a shallow-pitch gabled roof.  Upper story widnows are set in round-arch openings, framed by soldier bricks; the windows on the front facade second story have keystones.  On the front facade there are round windows at the center of the second and third floors; the second floor window has been filled with a panel housing a cross, while the third floor window shows a Star of David.

Chevry Lomday Mishnayes ("Society for Study of Mishnah"), an Orthodox Jewish congregation, was organized in 1918, and met in a variety of quarters before this synagogue was built in 1924.  It has as its shell a basic three-story apartment house design, with its principal modification the shapes of the second and third-floor windows.  The congregation remained here until 1963, when it moved to a private residence.  It has since been occupied by Christian groups, most recently the House of God.

See also
National Register of Historic Places listings in Hartford, Connecticut

References

Synagogues on the National Register of Historic Places in Connecticut
Neoclassical architecture in Connecticut
Buildings and structures completed in 1924
Churches in Hartford, Connecticut
Synagogues in Connecticut
Churches in Connecticut
National Register of Historic Places in Hartford, Connecticut